Romsey and Southampton North is a constituency represented in the House of Commons of the UK Parliament since its 2010 creation by Caroline Nokes for the Conservative Party. For the purposes of election expenses and type of returning officer it is a county constituency.

History
Parliament accepted the Boundary Commission's Fifth Periodic Review of Westminster constituencies which created this constituency for the 2010 general election primarily as an extended Romsey constituency.

Boundaries

Romsey and Southampton North is formed from electoral wards:

Bassett; and Swaythling in the City of Southampton:
Abbey, Ampfield and Braishfield, Blackwater, Broughton and Stockbridge, Chilworth, Nursling and Rownhams, Cupernham, Dun Valley, Harewood, Kings Somborne and Michelmersh, North Baddesley, Over Wallop, Romsey Extra, Tadburn, Valley Park in Test Valley

The area includes Stockbridge, which was a rotten borough (rotten parliamentary borough) until the latter's abolition under the Great Reform Act of 1832.

Constituency profile

The constituency takes in the bulk of a more affluent and older-population local government district with a fraction of a contrasting district: the net result is a working population whose income is close to the national average and lower than average reliance upon social housing. At the end of 2012, the unemployment rate in the constituency stood as 1.5% of the population claiming Jobseeker's Allowance, compared to the regional average of 2.4%. The borough contributing to the bulk of the seat has a low 13.5% of its population without a car, 18.4% of the population without qualifications and a high 30.5% with Level 4 qualifications or above. In terms of tenure 70.4% of homes are owned outright or on a mortgage as at the 2011 census in Test Valley district.

Members of Parliament

Elections

Elections in the 2010s

 

 

 

 

This constituency was contested for the first time at the 2010 general election. Liberal Democrat MP Sandra Gidley had been the MP for the predecessor seat of Romsey since 2000.

See also
List of parliamentary constituencies in Hampshire

References

Sources 
 Romsey and Southampton North on UKPollingReport

Parliamentary constituencies in Hampshire
Constituencies of the Parliament of the United Kingdom established in 2010
Politics of Southampton
Test Valley